The Energia Lunar Expedition was a project that was initiated by Valentin Glushko during 1988 to create a lunar base using the Energia booster. The Moon base was to be eventually used for mining helium 3 from the lunar surface.

Hardware 
The Energia expeditions involved at least two sections of hardware. which were placed into a Low Earth orbit in separate Energia launches.

Mission Profile

See also 
 Soviet Moonshot
 Space race

External links 
Link to the space encyclopedia.

Soviet lunar program
1988 in the Soviet Union